"Broken Heart" is the debut single from the hard rock band White Lion.

The song was originally from the band's debut album Fight to Survive released in 1985, but was later re-recorded and re-released as a single from the Mane Attraction album in 1991 which peaked at number 61 on the Billboard 200.

Music video
The single featured the band's debut music video with drummer Greg D'Angelo and bassist Dave Spitz appearing in the video after replacing Nicki Capozzi and Felix Robinson. The 1991 re-recorded version featured a new music video.

Compilations
The song along with the rest of the bands singles was featured on all of the bands major compilations including White Lion's 2020 compilation album, "'All You Need Is Rock 'N' Roll - The Complete Albums 1985-1991'".

Track listing

1985 version
"Broken Heart" - 3:33
"El Salvador" - 4:49

1991 version
"Broken Heart '91" - 4:09
"Leave Me Alone" - 4:26

Personnel

1985 version
Mike Tramp - vocals
Vito Bratta - guitar
Felix Robinson - bass, vocals 
Nicki Capozzi - drums

1991 version
Mike Tramp - vocals
Vito Bratta - guitar
James Lomenzo - bass
Greg D'Angelo - drums

In popular culture
On season 11 of American Idol, contestant Colton Dixon chose the song and covered it in the Idol's "Year They Were Born" feature. Colton Dixon was born in 1991.

References

1985 debut singles
1991 singles
White Lion songs
Hard rock ballads
Song recordings produced by Richie Zito
Songs written by Vito Bratta
Songs written by Mike Tramp
1985 songs
Asylum Records singles
Atlantic Records singles